Darbas (also Romanized as Dārbas; also known as Dārbast) is a village in Jolgah Rural District, in the Central District of Jahrom County, Fars Province, Iran. At the 2006 census, its population was 28, in 5 families.

References 

Populated places in Jahrom County